Košice tram network serves the city of Košice in eastern Slovakia since its opening in 1895. It is operated by Dopravný podnik mesta Košice, a. s. 

The network uses a standard  metre gauge. The system launched with horse trams in 1891 and trams in the city have been electrically powered since 1913.

History

Early years

On 14 November 1891, the first section of the horse railway was put into operation from the railway station through the Main Street to the Economic School (now Poliklinika Sever). Between 1895 and 1913, seven new steam locomotives were put into operation. The dual operation of horse and steam traction proved to be unreliable by that time. The network was electrified in 1913.

In 1964, the fast line to the Eastern Slovak IronWorks (now U. S. Steel Košice) was put into operation with a length of 13 km. Since 1979 until newer rolling stock entered the network, three-car T3 sets have been operated on the high-speed line which was unique to the territory of Czechoslovakia. Each train set thus was almost 45 meters long.

Post-communism

After the 1989 revolution, the transport company was transferred from the state to the city, which resulted in organizational changes of transport and the extension of tram line intervals. Three of the nine inner-city lines were cancelled (lines 1, 5 and 8). No new lines were launched since 1990, and only the most necessary investments were made. After 1989, KT8D5 and T6A5 trams were delivered to Košice. Because they reduced traffic performance, the 40 KT8 vehicles supplied proved redundant and since 1992 some of them have been sold to Miskolc (10 units), Strausberg (3 units) and Sarajevo (4 units). 

On T6A5 trams, automatic coupling heads have been replaced with classic Prague type coupling heads (identical to the type on T3 vehicles). Between 2003 and 2009, eight KT8D5 trams were retrofitted with a medium low-floor and several T3 trams have also been upgraded with electronic panels, new interiors and fresh coating. 

In April 2011, the first units of low-floor Vario LF trams were delivered to Košice.

Recent times

In 2014, Košice received investment from the EU Cohesion Fund for modernization of its network. Between 2014 and 2018, 46 brand new partially low-floor Vario LF2+ trams were delivered to Košice. Repairs and modernizations of tracks were done in phases; phase 1 between 2014 and 2015, phase 2 in 2015 with phase 3 repairs undertaken between 2016 and 2018.

Due to reconstruction of the Bardejovská tram depot, 27 trams were moved to railway sidings at U.S. Steel for longterm storage in March 2022.

Routes

Regular services

Eight regular services feature on the Košice tram network.

Regular services travel with 10 minute intervals in the morning rush hour, 15 minutes in between morning and afternoon, 12 minutes in the afternoon rush hour and 20 minute intervals in the evening.

Rapid tram services

Eight rapid tram line rotate between Košice's districts and the U.S. Steel plant in Košice.

Rolling Stock

See also
 Public transport in Košice

References

Bibliography

External links
Steel tramway pole in Košice reminder of city's transportation history

600 V DC railway electrification
Košice